Katelyn Morgan Rowland (born March 16, 1994) is an American soccer goalkeeper who currently plays for the North Carolina Courage in the National Women's Soccer League. Rowland previously played for FC Kansas City and the Western New York Flash in the NWSL. She is a three-time NWSL Champion. Rowland has represented the United States on various youth national teams including the under-20 and under-23 teams.

Early life
Born in Walnut Creek, California, Rowland attended Vacaville Christian High School where she played on the varsity basketball and volleyball teams and earned all-league honors in both sports. She played club soccer for San Juan and helped the team win a national championship in 2008. At the tournament, she was awarded the Golden Gloves Award. The same year, Top Drawer Soccer named her a "Player to Watch".

UCLA Bruins, 2011–2014
Rowland attended the University of California, Los Angeles where she played for the UCLA Bruins women's soccer team from 2011 to 2014. As a freshman, she was the starting goalkeeper in 20 of 21 matches and finished the year with a  record. Rowland was named to the Pac-12 All-Freshman Team and ranked second in the Pac-12 in shutouts (10), shutouts per game (0.50) and goals against average (0.61). During her sophomore year, she led the Pac-12 in shutouts (11) and shutouts per game (0.55). Her 0.57 goals against average (GAA) ranked second in the Pac-12 conference and 13th across the nation. She finished the season with a 17–3 record, tallied 46 saves, and allowed 11 goals. She earned Pac-12 second-team all-conference and honorable mention all-academic team honors. As a junior in 2013, Rowland's goals against average (GAA) of 0.27 and her save percentage of .903 led goalkeepers across the country. Her 15 shutouts set a school record and her 22 wins tied the school record for wins in a season. Rowland ranked second on UCLA's career charts with 52 wins and 36 shutouts. She was named to Soccer America's MVP team and to the NSCAA All-Pacific Region first-team UCLA won the school's first NCAA Women's Soccer
championship, the College Cup, in 2013.

As a senior, Rowland played every minute and set new school records for goals against average (GAA) with 0.245, consecutive shutouts (10) and consecutive shutout minutes (969). She set NCAA records for career shutouts (55) and single-season shutouts (19). As a goalkeeper, Rowland tallied two assists during consecutive games in the NCAA tournament. She finished her first year with the Bruins with a  record. She tallied 49 saves and allowed six goals (a school record). Rowland was named the Pac-12 Conference Goalkeeper of the Year and was named to the MAC Hermann Trophy Watch List.

Club career

FC Kansas City, 2015–2016
In January 2015, Rowland was selected by FC Kansas City as the 17th overall pick in the 2015 NWSL College Draft. As a backup keeper to Nicole Barnhart, Rowland played three matches for the Blues and recorded a 1.33 goals against average (GAA). FC Kansas City won the 2015 NWSL Championship.

Western New York Flash, 2016 
Rowland was traded to the Western New York Flash in June 2016. Kansas City general manager, Huw Williams noted that the trade would provide Rowland with "an opportunity to compete for immediate playing time. It also provides us with more options in the strong 2017 college draft." Rowland made six appearances for the Flash. After finishing the regular season in fourth place with a  record, the team advanced to the playoffs where they defeated the Portland Thorns 4–3 in extra time. The Flash defeated the Washington Spirit in penalty kicks during the NWSL championship final to win their first NWSL title.

Newcastle Jets, 2016–2017 
Rowland played on loan for the Newcastle Jets in the Australian W-League during the 2016–17 W-League season. She arrived at the Jets as an injury replacement for Kelsey Wys.

North Carolina Courage, 2017–2021 
In January 2017, it was announced that the Western New York Flash has been sold to the ownership group of the Carolina Railhawks. The team re-located to Cary, North Carolina and was renamed North Carolina Courage. Rowland was named to the 2017 NWSL Second XI 

In the 2018 NWSL season, Rowland started 18 games for North Carolina. She recorded 8 clean sheets, helping the Courage win their second straight NWSL Shield. In the play-offs, Rowland didn't play in the semi-final as she was recovering from a concussion, but returned to play in the NWSL Championship game. She recorded 3 saves, as the Courage defeated the Portland Thorns 3–0 to win the 2018 NWSL Championship.

Kansas City Current, 2021-2022 
On July 22, 2021, the Kansas City Current (then KC NWSL) acquired Rowland in a trade with the North Carolina Courage. Kansas City acquired Rowland and teammates Hailie Mace and Kristen Hamilton in exchange for Amy Rodriguez and $60,000 in allocation money.

Return to North Carolina Courage, 2022- 
After appearing in 4 games for the Kansas City Current, Rowland was traded back to the North Carolina Courage along with $200,000 in allocation money, and a first round pick in the 2023 NWSL Draft in exchange for Lynn Williams

International career
Rowland has represented the United States on the under-15, under-17, under-20, and under-23 national teams.  In 2014, she was the starting goalkeeper at the 2014 FIFA U-20 Women's World Cup and 2014 CONCACAF Women's U-20 Championship tournaments and was awarded the Golden Glove award at the CONCACAF Championship after tallying four shutouts.

Honors
FC Kansas City
NWSL Champions: 2015

Western New York Flash
NWSL Champions: 2016

North Carolina Courage
NWSL Champions: 2018, 2019
NWSL Shield: 2017, 2018, 2019
NWSL Runner-Up: 2017

Individual
NWSL Second XI: 2017

References

External links 
 
 US Soccer player profile
 FC Kansas City player profile
 UCLA player profile

1994 births
Living people
American women's soccer players
FC Kansas City draft picks
FC Kansas City players
National Women's Soccer League players
Newcastle Jets FC (A-League Women) players
North Carolina Courage players
People from Vacaville, California
Soccer players from California
Sportspeople from the San Francisco Bay Area
UCLA Bruins women's soccer players
United States women's under-20 international soccer players
Western New York Flash players
Women's association football goalkeepers